McCalls Branch is a stream in Benton County in the U.S. state of Missouri.

McCalls Branch has the name of H. M. McCall, an early settler.

See also
List of rivers of Missouri

References

Rivers of Benton County, Missouri
Rivers of Missouri